Weitersfelden is a municipality in the district of Freistadt in the Mühlviertel in the Austrian state of Upper Austria.

Districts 

Districts of Weitersfelden includes:

 Eipoldschlag
 Haid
 Harrachstal (Harrachsthal)
 Knaußer
 Markersdorf
 Nadelbach
 Rabenberg
 Reitern
 Ritzenedt
 Saghammer
 Straßreit
 Stumberg
 Waldfeld
 Weitersfelden
 Wienau
 Windgföll

Neighbouring municipalities

Population

Politics

References

Further reading 
 Gemeindeamt u. Ludwig Riepl (Hrsg): Weitersfelden - Ein heimatkundliches Lesebuch und a Ortschronik. 471 Seiten. 1997.
 Pfarramt und Ludwig Riepl (Hrsg): 650 Pfarre Weitersfelden. 1987. 48 Seiten.
 Gemeinde u. Ludwig Riepl (Hrsg): Weitersfelden im Wandel der Zeit. 60 Seiten. 1988.
 Ludwig Riepl: Das Leben des Hl. Martin. Ein Spiel um den 2. Kirchenpatron von Weitersfelden. UNDA-Verlag. 2000.
 Karl Leopoldseder: Volksmusik aus Weitersfelden. 2001. Buch mit Cd und DVD. 2001.
 Franz Priemetzhofer: Die Vogelarten des Gebiets um Weitersfelden. Naturkundliches Jahrbuch der Stadt Linz, 27, 1981, Seiten 83 -116
 Geschichtliches Literaturverzeichnis auf OÖ Geschichte
 Ludwig Riepl: Weitersfelden - Ein heimatkundliches Lesebuch und a Ortschronik. Plöchl-Verlag, 1997.
 Bistumsorganisation - Entstehung der Pfarren des Bistums Passau. Univ. Prof. Rudolf Zinnhobler. In: Ludwig Riepl (Hg), Weitersfelden.
 Universitat Passau. Universitätsbibliothek. Prof. Kons. Alfred Höllhuber. Hölzerene Freibauernsitze und frühgesichtliche Befestigungen im Gemeindegebiet Weitersfelden in Weitersfelden (Hg. Ludwig Riepl). Uni-Passau-Katalognummer s/a Med 149 und 280/NR 8296 W434R55.
 Universitat Passau. Universitätsbibliothek. Ludwig Riepl. Herrschaftsverhältnisse und erste Erwähnung in Weitersfelden. Sehr gute Zusammenfassung und Überblick über die Herrschaftsgeschichte der Herrschaft Reichenstein und Ruttenstein. Institut für Geschichte der Uni. Passau. Uni-Passau-Katalognummer s/a Med 149 und 280/NR 8296 W434R55.

External links 

 Gemeinde Weitersfelden
 Geomix Weitersfelden

Cities and towns in Freistadt District